Aarti Chabria (born 21 November 1982) is an Indian actress and a former model who appears in Hindi, Telugu, Punjabi and Kannada films.

Career
Actress Aarti Chabria started her career as a model in advertisements at the age of three years. Her first advertisement was a press ad for Farex. After which she continued modelling for more than 300 television commercials for Maggi Noodles, Pepsodent toothpaste, Clean & Clear face wash, Amul Frostick Ice cream, Krack cream, LML trendy scooter. Her recent TVC's are Kalyan Jewellers with Amitabh Bachchan, Nirma Advance with Hrithik Roshan, Goldie Masale with Salman Khan to name a few.

She won the Miss India Worldwide 1999 pageant in November 1999 along with awards for the sub rounds where she was crowned Miss Photogenic and Miss Beautiful Face. After winning the pageant, she did music videos 'Nasha hi Nasha hai' for Sukhwinder Singh, 'Chaahat' for Harry Anand, 'Meri Madhubala' for Avdooth Gupte, 'Roothe hue ho kyo' for Adnan Sami.

She made her acting debut in the Bollywood film, Tum Se Achcha Kaun Hai, which was released in 2002. Appreciated for her work opposite Akshay Kumar in Awara Paagal Deewana, and having starred in movies like Shootout at Lokhandwala, Dus Tola and 30 other films.

Chabria is the winner of the fourth season of Fear Factor - Khatron Ke Khiladi, in 2011.

Aarti also graduated in film direction from the New York Film Academy and later went on to produce and direct a 30 minute long-short film, Mumbai Varanasi Express which won many awards and was acquired by a Royal Stag Large Short Films. She currently directs TVC's and music videos under her production banner Rising Phoenix.

Aarti is the founder of an online coaching platform Victorious Mind Power  which hosts a range of programmes based on motivation architecture, spiritual strategy and creative mindset methods. She is the creator and host of a programme called The Perfect Soulmate Programme which helps people find their ideal life partner.

Filmography

Television

References

External links

 

1982 births
Living people
Actresses from Mumbai
Female models from Mumbai
Indian film actresses
Actresses in Telugu cinema
Actresses in Hindi cinema
Actresses in Kannada cinema
Actresses in Punjabi cinema
Sindhi people
Fear Factor: Khatron Ke Khiladi participants